Raghav Bahl is an Indian businessman, a serial entrepreneur, and an investor best known for his past ownership of several television channels, including TV18 India. He was the Founding/Controlling shareholder & managing director of Network18 Group, a media group that he started in 1993 and grew into one of the largest collection of media properties in India.

At its peak, the group controlled by Raghav Bahl included media and internet-based media outlets such as in.com, IBNLive.com, Moneycontrol.com, Firstpost.com, Cricketnext, Homeshop18, bookmyshow.com, Forbes India, TV channels such as Colors and some in partnership with international media groups such as NBC TV18, CNN-IBN, IBN7, MTV, and CNBC Awaaz.

By late 2011, according to a LiveMint article, Bahl's media group had a large debt, was running in loss and banks were unwilling to lend the group additional capital. Bahl's group sought capital from the Reliance Industries Ltd in 2012, and two years later Reliance took over the media empire and Bahl left the Network18 group on 29 May 2014.

After departing from the Network18 group, Bahl co-founded Quintillion Media Pvt Ltd with his wife Ritu Kapur. This media group controls Thequint.com. Bahl's new venture entered a joint venture agreement with Bloomberg L.P. to launch BloombergQuint in 2016.

Early life
He received his schooling from St. Xavier's School, Delhi. He graduated in Economics Honors from St. Stephens College, and then did a Masters in Business Administration from the Faculty of Management Studies.

His sister, Vandana Malik, also served in various positions under the Network18 Group. Her daughter and Bahl's niece, Avantika Malik, was married to Bollywood actor Imran Khan.

Career
He began his career as a management consultant with A.F. Ferguson & Co, followed by a stint with American Express Bank, and later moved on to media. Raghav has over 22 years experience in television and journalism.

He started his career in media in 1985 as a Correspondent and Anchorperson for Doordarshan. He was the Anchorperson and Production Consultant for India's first monthly video news magazine, Newstrack, produced by the India Today group. From 1991 to 1993, he was the Executive Director of Business India Television and produced the Business India Show and Business A.M. on Doordarshan.

In 1999, he launched CNBC-TV18. He was responsible for directing most of the work of TV18 and channels like CNBC-Awaaz, Nickelodeon and Colors. Raghav served as the managing director of TV18 Group till July 2014.

By attracting media talent such as Rajdeep Sardesai and Sameer Manchanda, Bahl built an audience for his media properties.

By late 2011, Bahl's media group had amassed a large debt, was running in loss and banks were unwilling to lend the group additional capital. Bahl's group sought capital from the Reliance Industries Ltd in 2012. Bahl then brought the losses in his group under control, laid off hundreds of employees in his media group, closed or trimmed many of the properties within the group, according to the LiveMint.

Two years later, in 2014, under the terms of this financing agreement, Reliance took over the Network18 group. With the change in ownership, Bahl left the Network18 Group in 2014.

After leaving the Network18 Group, he founded Quintillion Media, a digital startup that publishes The Quint, along with his wife Ritu Kapur on 8 July 2014.

Writing
He has authored three books:

 Super Power? The Amazing Race Between China's Hare and India's Tortoise (Penguin, 2012)
 SuperEconomies: America, India, China, and the Future of the World (Penguin, 2016)
 Super Century: What India Must Do to Rise by 2050 (Penguin, 2019)

Awards
 In 1994, the World Economic Forum called Raghav a Global Leader of Tomorrow, and he won India's Sanskriti Award for Journalism.
 In 2007, he was named Ernst & Young's Entrepreneur of the Year for Business Transformation.
 In 2008, he won the Indian Telly Award for Lifetime Contribution to Indian Television.
 In 2011, he won the All India Management Association's Media Person of the Year award, as well as the Bombay Management Association's prize for Entrepreneur of the Year.
In 2017, he won the ISOMES SAMMAN by BAG Network24's in their Media Fest "MANTHAN".

Controversy 

 The Income tax department had raided Bahl's premises in Noida in October 2018 on charges of "bogus long term capital gains (LTCG) received by various beneficiaries" and other charges of tax evasion.

 Bahl had allegedly made ₹1.14 billion out of an investment of ₹30.3 million made in a penny stock company called PMC Fincorp that was promoted by a certain Raj Kumar Modi in 2011. Raj Kumar Modi is managing director of PMC Fincorp.
 ED also filed a case against Bahl regarding Money Laundering.

References

External links
 
 Raghav Bahl at Penguin India

Year of birth missing (living people)
Living people
Faculty of Management Studies – University of Delhi alumni
Indian television directors
Delhi University alumni